SS S.R. Kirby was a composite-hulled bulk carrier that served on the Great Lakes of North America from her construction in 1890 to her sinking in 1916. On May 8, 1916, while heading across Lake Superior with a cargo of iron ore and the steel barge George E. Hartnell in tow, she ran into a storm and sank with the loss of all but two of her 22-man crew off Eagle Harbor, Michigan (on the Keweenaw Peninsula).

History

Design and construction
S.R. Kirby (Official number 116325) was built in 1890 by the Detroit Dry Dock Company in Wyandotte, Michigan. She was a composite-hulled ship, meaning she had an iron frame and a wooden hull, constructed from white oak.
She was launched on August 17, 1890, (one source states August 24) as hull number 100. She was named after Stephen R. Kirby, father of well-known naval architect Frank E. Kirby.

She had gross register tonnage of 2338.68 (one source states 2479), and net register tonnage of 1823.28. She had two decks and a cargo capacity of 3300 tons.

The engine was powered by steam provided by two cylindrical  by  Scotch marine boilers, each of which had a working pressure of 160 psi. Both the engine and the boilers were built in Detroit, Michigan, by the Detroit Dry Dock Company.

She was the first freighter on the Great Lakes to be equipped with electric lights.

Service history
S.R. Kirby was built for the North Western Transportation Company of Detroit, Michigan. She received her enrollment in Detroit on June 13, 1890; her home port was Detroit. She made her maiden voyage in June 1890, during which she carried the largest load of iron ore ever to pass through the Soo Locks.

Beginning in 1896, S.R. Kirby towed the  steel barge George E. Hartnell, which she would tow for the remainder of her career.

On the morning of October 7, 1897, while entering the harbor in Erie, Pennsylvania, S.R. Kirby was blown ashore. It was initially suggested that if not freed quickly, Lake Erie would smash her to pieces. However, when she was released on October 8, it was discovered that she had sustained no damage.

She was freed at about 7:00 A.M. on September 9, 1904, by the tugs W.G. Mason and S.W. Gee, after jettisoning about 500 tons of her cargo into the schooner West Side and the scow Buffalo. After being released, she was towed to Buffalo.

On June 27, 1914 S.R. Kirby was forced to cast off George E. Hartnell outside of Duluth Harbor due to a severe storm; George E. Hartnell eventually drifted on to Park Point and was freed a few days later.

Final voyage
On May 7 or 8, 1916, after loading iron ore bound for Cleveland, Ohio, S.R. Kirby left Ashland, Wisconsin under the command of Captain David Girardin, with the steel barge George E. Hartnell in tow. At the time, the weather was calm. As S.R. Kirby and George E. Hartnell approached the Keweenaw Peninsula, the weather became worse. At around 10:45 A.M. on May 8, as the two ships approached Eagle Harbor, Michigan, S.R. Kirby was struck by a massive wave, broke up, and sank in about a minute. George E. Hartnell broke loose and was picked up by the steamer E.H. Utley.

Two crewmen, Second Mate Joseph Mudra of Chicago, Illinois, and fireman Otto Lindquist of Pequaming, Michigan, survived. Mudra was picked up by the freighter Harry A. Berwind and Lindquist was saved by the freighter Joseph Block. Mudra recounted:
The steamer broke in two without a moments warning. As the ship went down, which took up so little time that I could scarcely believe my eyes, cabins broke loose and rafts floated. I did not see any of the men come up out of the forecastle, and while I saw some of them afterwards clinging to bits of wreckage, I believe most of them were caught in the forecastle and were unable to get out.

Captain Girardin's English bulldog Tige also survived and was delivered to Girardin's widow in Detroit.

After her sinking, S.R. Kirby was valued at $125,000. It was speculated that she was heavily overloaded or improperly loaded and wouldn't have had much of a chance of survival in the storm.

S.R. Kirby wreck

Discovery
In June 2018 the Great Lakes Shipwreck Historical Society (GLSHS) were conducting a search for shipwrecks off the coast of the Keweenaw Peninsula. They located what appeared to be wreckage but were unsure if it was a shipwreck. They returned to the site the following year to identify the wreck, suspecting that it might be the wreck of S.R. Kirby. The director of marine operations of the GLSHS, Darryl Ertel Jr. and his team used a remotely operated vehicle to confirm the wreck was S.R. Kirby based on the nature of the wreckage.

Discovery of S.R. Kirby wreck was made public in July 2019.

S.R. Kirby today
Her wreck is completely broken up and strewn over a large area. There are several sections of the hull that still show the iron frame with the wooden hull attached. Bruce Lynn of the GLSHS remarked that the wreck of S.R. Kirby "looks like an explosion on the bottom of the lake".

References

Notes

Citations

Further reading

 
 

Ships built in Wyandotte, Michigan
1890 ships
Maritime incidents in 1916
Shipwrecks of the Michigan coast
Shipwrecks of Lake Superior
Great Lakes freighters
Maritime incidents in 1897
Maritime incidents in 1904
Maritime incidents in 1892
Maritime incidents in 1914
Keweenaw County, Michigan
2018 archaeological discoveries
Ships sunk in storms